São Braz do Piauí is a municipality in the state of Piauí in the Northeast region of Brazil.

The municipality is in the Capivara-Confusões Ecological Corridor, created in 2006 to link the Serra da Capivara National Park to the Serra das Confusões National Park.

See also
List of municipalities in Piauí

References

Municipalities in Piauí